Norman Langen (born 7 March 1985 in Bardenberg, Germany) is a German singer and a participant in season 8 of Deutschland sucht den Superstar who finished in 7th place. He likes to sing in German. He likes Schlager, pop and dance music.

Biography

Early life
He was born in Badenberg, Germany but currently lives in Übach-Palenberg, North Rhine-Westphalia. He is a trained welder. But he is retraining as a hospice nurse. He has previously sung in a boy band (BXess, later Manhattan). He has three sisters. He was slightly overweight when he was a kid.

Deutschland sucht den Superstar

Post-DSDS
Langen is "in demand" and is a "solid player" in the music industry. Langen stated that "I'm still traveling a lot. The success of DSDS has never really flattened."

Discography

Singles

External links 

 
 Website of Norman Langen
 Pictures of Norman Langen

References

1985 births
People from Heinsberg (district)
Deutschland sucht den Superstar participants
21st-century German male singers
Living people